Lady Soseowon of the Dongju Gim clan was the daughter of Gim Haeng-Pa who became the 21st wife of Taejo of Goryeo and the younger sister of her husband's 20th wife, Lady Daeseowon.

References

External links
소서원부인 on Encykorea .

Year of birth unknown
Year of death unknown
Consorts of Taejo of Goryeo
People from North Hwanghae